Momar Ramon N'Diaye (born 13 July 1987) is a Senegalese professional footballer who plays for FC Rodange 91.

Career
Born in Yeumbeul, N'Diaye began his career with Génération Foot. He joined FC Metz in 2001. He played on loan for Châteauroux in the 2008–09 season. On 21 January 2010, he left Metz to sign for Rot Weiss Ahlen. After a half year and the relegation of Rot Weiss Ahlen, he left the club on 27 May 2010 to sign for FSV Frankfurt.

Ahead of the 2019–20 season, N'Diaye joined FC Rodange 91.

International career
In 2005, at 18, N'Diaye made his debut for the Senegal national football team.

Personal life
His cousins are Ibrahima Gueye and Babacar Gueye, who also played for Metz.

References

External links
 

1987 births
Living people
Senegalese footballers
FC Metz players
LB Châteauroux players
Rot Weiss Ahlen players
FSV Frankfurt players
Beijing Sport University F.C. players
China League One players
Ligue 1 players
Ligue 2 players
2. Bundesliga players
Association football forwards
Expatriate footballers in France
Expatriate footballers in Germany
Expatriate footballers in China
Senegalese expatriate sportspeople in France
French sportspeople of Senegalese descent
Senegal international footballers